Central-Alameda is a  square mile neighborhood within the South Los Angeles region of Los Angeles, California.

Geography

According to the Mapping L.A. project of the Los Angeles Times, Central-Alameda, which measure 2.18 square miles, is bounded on the north and northeast by Downtown L.A., on the east by the city of Vernon, on the south by Huntington Park and Florence-Firestone, and on the west by Historic South Central and South Park. The street boundaries are north, Washington Boulevard; south,  Slauson Avenue; west, Central Avenue, and east, Alameda Street.  Central-Alameda encompasses the area of the neighborhood traditionally known as Nevin.

Population

According to the U.S. census, the neighborhood's population in 2000 was 40,947, which amounted to 18,760 people per square mile, among the highest densities for the city of Los Angeles and among the highest densities for the county. In 2008 the L.A. Department of City Planning estimated the population at 43,638. The average household size was 4.3 people, considered high for both the city and the county. Renters occupied 70.2% of the housing units and owners inhabited the rest, 29.8%.

There were 1,980 families headed by single parents, 26.3% of the total, considered high for both the city and the county. The median age was 22, "young for the city and young for the county." The percentages of residents aged 10 through 34 were among the county's highest. The percentages of never married men and women were among the county's highest. Just 444 people, 1.8% of the neighborhood population, were veterans, low for both the city and the county.

The Los Angeles Times considered the neighborhood "not especially diverse," with Latinos measuring 84.6% of the population (high for the county), blacks 13.3% (also high for the county), whites 1% and Asians 0.7%.

The median household income of $31,559 (in 2008 dollars) was low for both the city and the county.

Government

As part of the city government, the neighborhood is represented by the Central-Alameda Neighborhood Council.

Education and recreation

In education, just 2.8% of the residents 25 and older had a four-year degree, considered low when compared to the city and the county as a whole. Seventy-five percent of residents in that age range had failed to complete high school, the highest percentage of any Los Angeles City neighborhood.

Public school
Jefferson High School is situated within Central-Alameda at 41st and Hooper streets.

Recreation
City recreation facilities include:
 Central Recreation Center, Naomi Avenue at East 22nd Street
 Ross Snyder Recreation Center, 41st Street
 Central Avenue Jazz Park, Central Avenue at 42nd Place
 Fred Roberts Park and Recreation Center, Long Beach Avenue between East 46th Street and East 48th Place
 Latham Park, Latham Street at East 53rd Street
 Slauson Recreation Center, 53rd Street at Compton Avenue
 Augustus F. Hawkins Natural Park, Slauson and Compton avenues

References

External links
 Central-Alameda real-estate overview
  Central-Alameda  crime map and statistics

Neighborhoods in Los Angeles
South Los Angeles